Saint Parascheva Church is a Romanian Orthodox church in Desești Commune, Maramureș County, Romania. Built in 1770, it is one of eight buildings that make up the wooden churches of Maramureș UNESCO World Heritage Site, and is also listed as a historic monument by the country's Ministry of Culture and Religious Affairs.

References

Bibliography
 
 

Desesti
Churches completed in 1770
18th-century Eastern Orthodox church buildings
Desesti
Romanian Orthodox churches in Romania
1770 establishments in the Habsburg monarchy
18th-century establishments in Hungary